Xestogaster is a South American genus of broad-nosed weevils in the family Curculionidae.

Taxonomy 
The genus was described by Sir Guy A. K. Marshall in 1922 (p. 221).

Species 
Xestogaster contains four described species:
 Xestogaster mucorea (Kirsch, 1889) – Peru
 Xestogaster porosa (Marshall, 1922) – Colombia
 Xestogaster squalida (Marshall, 1922) – Colombia
 Xestogaster viridilimbata (Bovie, 1907) – Brazil

Description 
Members of the genus Xestogaster are similar to members of the genera Exorides and Compsus.

According to Marshall:

Distribution 
The genus Xestogaster is distributed in Brazil, Colombia, and Peru.

References 

Curculionidae genera
Insects described in 1922